Kokk is Estonian occupational surname literally meaning "cook".

Aivar Kokk (born 1960), Estonian politician
Jaan Kokk (1903–1942), Estonian politician
Kaspar Kokk (born 1982), Estonian cross-country skier 
Enn Kokk (1937–2019), Estonian-born Swedish Social Democratic politician, journalist and writer
Marten Kokk (born 1973), Estonian diplomat and statesman
Rene Kokk (born 1980), Estonian politician

Estonian-language surnames
Occupational surnames